Nordic combined at the 2018 Winter Olympics was held at the Alpensia Ski Jumping Centre and Alpensia Cross-Country Skiing Centre. The three events were scheduled to take place between 14 and 22 February 2018.

Qualification

A total of 55 quota spots were available to athletes to compete at the games. A maximum of five athletes could be entered by any one National Olympic Committee. Competitors were eligible to compete if they had scored points at a World or Continental cup event during the qualification period of July 2016 to 21 January 2018. The top 55 on the Olympic quota allocation list respecting the maximum of four per country qualified to compete.

Competition schedule
The following was the competition schedule for all three events.

All times are (UTC+9).

Medal summary

Medal table

Events

Participating nations
A total of 55 athletes from 16 nations (including the IOC's designation of Olympic Athletes from Russia) were scheduled to participate.

References

External links
Official Results Book – Nordic combined

 
Nordic combined
2018
Olympics
Nordic combined competitions in South Korea